Bug-A-Salt is the brand name of a plastic gun used to kill soft-bodied insects by hitting them with salt particles.

Description
The Bug-A-Salt device uses granular table salt as non-toxic projectiles to kill insects. The plastic gun is designed to spray up to 80 discharges of salt, which forms a conical spread pattern, similar to the blast pattern from a shotgun.

Biologist Michael Dickinson of the California Institute of Technology says flies cannot dodge the tiny salt particles, but will be protected by their arthropod exoskeleton and will only be stunned.

History
Bug-A-Salt was created by Lorenzo Maggiore and patented in 2012. Maggiore invented the tool to kill houseflies at a distance, without creating a mess.

The Skell Inc company launched its Bug-A-Salt product in 2012 on the Indiegogo platform. At the close of Skell's crowd-funding campaign on September 11, 2012, the company had sold more than 21,400 units of the original model of the Bug-A-Salt salt gun.

See also
Fly-killing device

References

External links
Company website
This self-made millionaire invented a ‘gun’ that shoots salt at flies
Huffington Post - Bug-A-Salt Launch Article

Insect control
Pest control techniques
Products introduced in 2012